A diesel motorcycle  is a motorcycle with a diesel engine.

Production vehicles

Sommer Diesel 462

Sommer Motorradtechnik produces the Sommer Diesel 462. It is powered by Bavarian Hatz Diesel. The Sommer-diesel motorcycle is assembled by hand in small batches in Eppstein. Some components of the wheels and gears may be supplied by Royal Enfield of India.

Track T-800CDI

Track T-800CDI was a production model produced by Dutch company Evaproducts with an 800 cc three-cylinder common rail turbo diesel engine used in Smart automobiles. It used a continuously variable transmission. It was only sold in the Netherlands, and the company eventually closed.

Royal Enfield

Royal Enfield in India was the only manufacturer that had built a diesel motorcycle in mass production in the 1980s. An industrial diesel was installed in the frame of the British-based Royal Enfield. However, due to pollution laws, this bike is no longer produced. Initially street mechanics were mounting this engine in used Bullets, like retro Royal Enfield Bikes, with the 350 cc retrofit engine. On seeing the success of these bikes; Royal Enfield started manufacturing Bullets with the diesel engine and named it the Taurus. The Taurus was available with an electric starter in 1993.

Sooraj 325cc Diesel
Sooraj, a company based in Saharanpur, India produced a diesel motorcycle with a 4-speed Albion (The Albion Motor Company of Scotstoun, Glasgow was a manufacturer of cars and commercial vehicles but were best known in the motorcycling world for their gearboxes.
Albion gearboxes were fitted to Aston, Calthorpe, Carfield, Cotton, Coventry-Eagle, Dot, Elfson, Greeves, Hailstones and Ravenhall, Haden Precision, Lily, McKenzie, Metro-Tyler, Priest-JAP, Priory, Radco, Rex-Acme, Ruby, Saxelby, Spur, Sun, Talbot, Triplette, Triumph Gloria, Weatherell, Whitworth and many other British motorcycles) Royal Enfield gearbox fitted with a Lombardini 325cc engine.

Hayes Diversified Technologies M1030M1

After several years engine development at Cranfield University, the HDT M1030M1 has entered service. It is produced by Hayes Diversified Technologies (HDT), and it is based around a modified Kawasaki KLR650. M1030M1s have successfully taken part at the British National Rally and the Bonneville Speed Trials.

The U.S. Marine Corps bought 440 of the M1030M1 model, under the name M1030M1 JP8/Diesel, and received 214. The M1030M1E AVTUR/Diesel Military motorcycle is sold to British and European NATO countries.  A version made for the civilian market, the D650A1 "Bulldog" was originally slated for release in March 2006, but due to increased military demand for the M1030M1, production of the civilian Bulldog has been delayed indefinitely.

In the Summer of 2010 at Eurosatory, a French defence contractor exhibition, HDT presented the HDT 1030M2 a major upgrade of their present HDT1030M1. The 1030M2 chief change is an upgraded 670 cc engine which has a multifueled capability and produced 20% more power, and through a patented technology called MAC-C1 enables the engine to use not only standard automobile gasoline and truck diesel fuel, but five major jet fuel types; and even the heavier vegetable oil based biodiesel. As of September 2010 no orders have been placed.

Faired and unfaired Hayes Diesel motorcycles won second and fourth place at the 2011 Mid-Ohio Craig Vetter Fuel Economy Challenge.

Neander

The Neander uses a parallel twin cylinder turbo diesel engine with two meshed counter-rotating crankshafts, which the manufacturer claims to remove engine vibrations.

Axiom Diesel Cycles Knight
In 2020, Axiom Diesel presented a prototype of a cruiser built using an air cooled diesel engine. In 2021, they presented a model at the International Motorcycle Show (IMS) in Dallas, United States, using a 1-litre turbo diesel engine mated to a 4 speed gearbox to power the motorcycle.

See also
List of motorcycles by type of engine

References 

Motorcycle classifications
Motorcycle engines